Enyalius brasiliensis the  Brazilian fathead anole, is a species of lizard in the family Leiosauridae. It is native to Brazil and Uruguay.

References

Enyalius
Reptiles described in 1830
Reptiles of Brazil
Reptiles of Uruguay
Taxa named by René Lesson